The Tenggol Island bent-toed gecko (Cyrtodactylus leegrismeri) is a species of lizard in the family Gekkonidae. The species is endemic to Tenggol Island in Malaysia.

Etymology
The specific name, leegrismeri, is in honor of American herpetologist Larry Lee Grismer.

Habitat

Description

Reproduction
The mode of reproduction of C. leegrismeri is unknown.

References

Further reading
Chan, Kin Onn; Ahmad, Norhayati (2010). "A new insular species of Cyrtodactylus (Squamata: Gekkonidae) from northeastern Peninsular Malaysia, Malaysia". Zootaxa 2389: 47-56. (Cyrtodactylus leegrismeri, new species).
Grismer LL (2011). Lizards of Peninsular Malaysia, Singapore and their Adjacent Archipelagos. Frankfurt am Main: Chimaira. 728 pp. .
Grismer LL, Quah ESH (2019). "An updated and annotated checklist of the lizards of Peninsular Malaysia, Singapore, and their adjacent archipelagos". Zootaxa 4545 (2): 230–248.

Cyrtodactylus
Reptiles described in 2010